The CFSB Center is an 8,600-seat arena located in Murray, Kentucky near the intersection of Ky. 121 and U.S. 641. The arena is the home of the Murray State Racers Basketball teams. It was previously known as the Regional Special Events Center, or "RSEC", until the name was changed on September 17, 2010 following a $3.3 million donation from Community Financial Services Bank to Murray State Athletics. While the CFSB Center is commonly used for basketball, it was designed as a multi-purpose facility that also frequently hosts concerts, trade shows, and conventions.

History

The Regional Special Events Center (RSEC) was built as a replacement for Racer Arena, the school's former basketball arena. While Racer Arena was structurally sound (it still stands and is now used for volleyball), it was growing increasingly obsolete, and its capacity of 5,500 proved too small for the men's basketball program. Talk of a new basketball arena began around 1978, when the basketball program was beginning to make big strides toward success.  The project became reality in the early 1990s when the Kentucky General Assembly appropriated $18 million for construction of the project on the condition that the school would raise at least $2 million locally. Ground was broken in 1995; however, construction problems and cost overruns delayed completion of the facility until 1998 and pushed the total cost to $23 million for the  facility.

RSEC officially opened on September 12, 1998, but the first event was actually the Kentucky Baptist Youth Conference in June 1998, which took place before construction was completed.  Tim McGraw played the first concert at the facility on September 26, 1998 to a crowd of about 8,000 people.

In 2004, new basketball locker rooms and a weight room were constructed in the Regional Special Events Center.

Community Financial Services Bank made a $3.3 million donation to Murray State athletics in September 2010 in exchange for naming rights to the Regional Special Events Center. The name of the facility officially changed to the CFSB Center on September 17, 2010. Following the donation, Murray State also unveiled plans in January 2011 for facility expansion and upgrades to the CFSB Center. Since the building was constructed as a multi-purpose facility, the other events held at the CFSB Center often restrict the amount of court time available to the Murray State basketball teams. The expansion plan calls for a new practice facility attached to the CFSB Center that will give both men's and women's basketball teams unlimited access to courts. In addition to new practice space, the expansion will include new office space for basketball coaches. The university also has plans to construct luxury boxes for the CFSB Center and relocate the MSU Athletics Hall of Fame to the CFSB Center.

Relocation of the MSU Athletics Hall of Fame to the CFSB Center was completed in Summer 2011, and Hastings & Chivetta was selected as the architect for construction of the new practice facility and coaching office space. Construction work on the facility expansion was originally expected to begin by November 2011; however, it was delayed until after the nationally televised final home game of the 2011-12 men's basketball season against the nationally ranked Saint Mary's Gaels. Preliminary ground work on the CFSB Center expansion finally began in late February 2012. The construction contract was awarded to Pinnacle, Inc. of Benton, Kentucky. The addition to the CFSB Center is scheduled to open in January 2013.

Features
The CFSB Center uses a split-level concourse system, with the lower level section accessed through a lower level entrance (Quad A, Northeast Entrance just off Highway 121) and the upper level accessed through any entrance, primarily at the main entrance (Quad B, Southeast Entrance just off Gilbert Graves Drive).

Lower Level
The lower level is the main concourse and features street level access from two of the four gates located on Gilbert Graves and US Highway 121.  This level accesses sections 101 to 121. It is on this level where the main ticket box offices are located. The lower level also features VIP concessions, locker rooms, the Murray Room (a banquet-style or meeting space for up to 200 people), and the administrative offices.

Upper Level
The Upper level accesses sections 201 through 222, as well as standing room and four concessions areas. Surrounding the upper level is a four lane rubberized track.  The state-of-the-art rubberized floor provides a safe and comfortable indoor walking experience.  The track is available to Murray State students, faculty and staff, as well as the local community.  Just seven laps around the track is equal to one mile (1.6 km).

Main Box Office
The CFSB Center is a Ticketmaster facility.  All tickets can be bought at the facility, or online.

Sports Medicine Room
This large area is dedicated solely to the care and health of MSU athletes.  It includes two general offices and a doctor's office, as well as a whirlpool room.

Weight Room
This room is utilized by the men's and women's basketball teams for strength training.  All athletes who utilize the weight room are in direct supervision of their trainer.

Officials Locker Rooms
These rooms not only serve as the place where officials will come to prepare for games, but also as production offices for concerts and other special events.  Road managers and the production staff have online access in these rooms.

Loading Dock Area
Built for convenience and easy access, the loading dock area includes three bays that are large enough to drive three 18-wheelers through.  It also offers show power and enough shore power for four buses.

Basketball record crowds

The CFSB Center is one of the loudest arenas in college basketball. During the February 18, 2012 game between the Racers and the Saint Mary's Gaels, peak noise levels of 138 dBA were measured in the CFSB Center. This is the highest documented noise level ever recorded at an indoor basketball arena.

Concerts

 Tim McGraw - September 26, 1998
 MTV Campus Invasion featuring Garbage and Lit - October 27, 1999
 3 Doors Down - October 10, 2000
 Lifehouse, The Calling, and Michelle Branch - September 18, 2001
 Nelly and the St. Lunatics, Abyss, Three Strikes, and CORE PROjECT - March 25, 2002
 MTV Campus Invasion 2K2 featuring Nickelback, Default, Injected, and Starsailor - April 18, 2002 
 Fuel and Smile Empty Soul - October 13, 2003
 Kanye West - September 20, 2004
 John Mayer and Mat Kearney - February 16, 2007
 Kansas and 38 Special - October 3, 2009
 Maroon 5 - November 2, 2009
 Skillet and TobyMac - March 7, 2010
 Kevin Skinner, Sierra Hull, and Highway 111 - July 3, 2010
 Miranda Lambert - October 8, 2010
 Skillet, Disciple, and Manafest - October 18, 2011
 Casting Crowns, Sanctus Real, The Afters, and Lindsay McCaul - November 10, 2011
 Lady Antebellum, Josh Kelley, and Edens Edge - December 11, 2011
 Eric Church, - October 21, 2012
 Bob Dylan, - April 27, 2013
 Florida Georgia Line, Colt Ford, and Dallas Smith - October 10, 2013
 Zac Brown Band- February 8, 2014

See also
 List of NCAA Division I basketball arenas

References

External links
 CFSB Center website.
 Murray State University home page.
 GoRacers.com feature on the Regional Special Events Center.

Murray State Racers men's basketball
College basketball venues in the United States
Basketball venues in Kentucky
Buildings and structures in Calloway County, Kentucky
1998 establishments in Kentucky
Sports venues completed in 1998